Willamette Valley Firebirds were an American soccer team that played in Corvallis, Oregon.

They began as the Palo Alto Firebirds based in Palo Alto, California. They moved to San Jose, California in 1994 and became the Silicon Valley Firebirds. They were renamed the Portland Firebirds after they moved to Portland, Oregon in 1995. The next year they moved to Corvallis and became the Willamette Valley Firebirds.

Year-by-year

Defunct soccer clubs in Oregon
Association football clubs established in 1992
Association football clubs disestablished in 2000
1995 establishments in California
2000 disestablishments in Oregon
Soccer clubs in Oregon
Sports in Corvallis, Oregon